Alkoholen Delirium (Alcoholic Delirium) is the debut album of Bulgarian rock band Hipodil, released in 1993 under the Unison-RTM label. Although some tracks were included in the band's Tu'pest compilation in 2000, the album was only released on audio cassettes.

The album immediately attracted the attention of the public with its explicit lyrics and punk musical stylings, which, though not unknown in Bulgaria, were rarely recorded and performed. The album also reflected the changes in Bulgaria, which was desperately trying to cope with the legacy of the recently overturned Communist regime. Hipodil enjoyed and even abused this newfound freedom, a fact that is quite visible in their self-produced debut.  They also rode a wave of scandal provoked by their explicit lyrics, which helped create a cult following, mainly in Sofia and some other big cities.

Analysis 

The music was inspired heavily by Slayer and Judas Priest. Using only Bulgarian lyrics, rich in slang and puns, Hipodil managed to transcend their shortcomings in musical talent and the poor quality production work. Inexperienced as they were, Hipodil smartly invited an assortment of musicians, which greatly added to their music's appeal.

The biggest hit was "Jnata" ("The Woman"), which was the first to get airplay and even had a music video. But, the audience chose the quasi-ballad "Momicheto" ("The Girl") which quickly became a gig favorite despite misogynistic lyrics.

Tracks 
 Triumf na zlata vest (A Triumph of the Bad News) - 0:24
 Hipobir (Hipobeer) - 1:30
 Sutrin go navira (He Stick It In Every Morning) - 2:12
 Bira s vodka/Alkoholen delirium (Beer with Vodka/Alcoholic Delirium) - 2:43
 Edin fus (One Fuss) - 1:43
 Momicheto (The Girl) - 2:59
 Jenata (The Woman) - 2:18
 Babata (The Grandma) - 0:04
 Novata (The New Girl) - 4:30
 Az te mrazya (I Hate You) - 1:30
 Jenkene na tzombi (Women Petting) - 0:30
 Klitoren orgazum (Clitoris Orgasm) - 2:07
 Grozna si kato salata (You're Ugly Like a Salad) - 3:59
 Himna (The Anthem) - 2:45
 Mnogo zle (Very Bad) - 3:20
 Itzo Petroff - 0:45
 Bira (Beer) - 1:20
 Rozova seriya (Pink Episode) - 2:11
 Ne vyarvam v teb (I Don't Believe in You) - 0:41
 Chift ochi (A Couple of Eyes) - 2:00
 Maykite (The Mothers) - 3:06
 Reigun v kruv (Reagan in Blood) - 0:15

Group members 

 Svetoslav Vitkov - vocals
 Petar Todorov - guitars
 Patzo - bass guitar
 Lachezar Marinov - drums
 Hristo Pavlov - saxophone and flute
 Kircho Makedonski - trumpet
 Ventzi Mitzov - keyboard, vocals
 Marin Chichov - photograph
 Chavdar Grigorov - design
 Ventzislav Yankov - engineer
 Ivan Gradinarov - engineer
 Vasko Neshev - engineer
 Boyko Petkov - mixing

References

External links 
 Alkoholem delirium at Discogs

Hipodil albums
1993 debut albums